Pellegrino da San Daniele (1467–1547) was an Italian painter in the late-Quattrocento and Renaissance styles, active in the Friulian region.

Born at San Daniele del Friuli, he is also known as Martino da Udine.  He completed frescoes in the church of San Antonio in the town of San Daniele. He later was strongly influenced by Il Pordenone. Among his pupils were Luca Monverde, Girolamo da Udine, and Sebastiano Florigerio.

Sources

1467 births
1547 deaths
People from San Daniele del Friuli
15th-century Italian painters
Italian male painters
16th-century Italian painters
Italian Renaissance painters